Orange Grove Plantation or Orange Grove Plantation House may refer to:

Orange Grove Plantation (Daytona Beach, Florida), significant in history of Daytona Beach, Florida
Orange Grove Plantation House (Terrebonne Parish, Louisiana), listed on the National Register of Historic Places (NRHP)
Orange Grove Plantation House (Plaquemines Parish, Louisiana)
Orange Grove Plantation (Saint Helena Island, South Carolina), NRHP-listed

See also
Orange Grove (disambiguation)